Harold Seymour Shapiro (2 April 1928 – 5 March 2021) was a professor of mathematics at the Royal Institute of Technology in Stockholm, Sweden, best known for inventing the so-called Shapiro polynomials (also known as Golay–Shapiro polynomials or Rudin–Shapiro polynomials) and for work on quadrature domains.

His main research areas were approximation theory, complex analysis, functional analysis, and partial differential equations.
He was also interested in the pedagogy of problem-solving.

Born and raised in Brooklyn, New York, Shapiro earned a B.Sc. from the City College of New York in 1949 and earned his M.S. degree from the Massachusetts Institute of Technology in 1951. He received his Ph.D. in 1952 from MIT; his thesis was written under the supervision of Norman Levinson.  He was the father of cosmologist Max Tegmark, a graduate of the Royal Institute of Technology and now a professor at MIT. Shapiro died on 5 March 2021, aged 92.

See also
Rudin–Shapiro sequence
List of Jewish mathematicians#S

References

External links 
Shapiro's homepage

 Rudin–Shapiro Curve by Eric Rowland, The Wolfram Demonstrations Project.

1928 births
2021 deaths
20th-century American mathematicians
21st-century American mathematicians
American Jews
Academic staff of the KTH Royal Institute of Technology
Massachusetts Institute of Technology alumni
Mathematical analysts
Functional analysts
Approximation theorists
American emigrants to Sweden